Ust-Bryan is a rural locality (a selo) in Zaigrayevsky District, Republic of Buryatia, Russia. The population was 1,395 as of 2010. There are 22 streets.

Geography 
Ust-Bryan is located 19 km northwest of Zaigrayevo (the district's administrative centre) by road. Imeni Serova is the nearest rural locality.

References 

Rural localities in Zaigrayevsky District